Team UFF is a Brazilian UCI Continental cycling team established in 2017.

References

UCI Continental Teams (Asia)
Cycling teams established in 2017
Cycling teams based in Brazil
2017 establishments in Brazil